Mariano Moreno en su mesa de trabajo is a portrait by the Chilean artist Pedro Subercaseaux. It shows the artist's interpretation of Mariano Moreno, Secretary of War of the Argentine Primera Junta, the first national government, working at his desk. It is currently regarded as the canonical image of Moreno.

Description

The portrait was requested to Subercaseaux by Antonio Carranza in 1908, in the context of the proximity of the Argentina Centennial two years later. His instructions were that the portrait should represent Mariano Moreno while working hard, late in the night, writing with a quill, with many papers scattered around, and worried by the gravity of the measures being taken. 

Subercaseaux was not very satisfied with his work, thinking that his version of Moreno was not as thin as Moreno was reported to be.

The portrait is currently kept at the National Historical Museum.

See also
 Mariano Moreno

References

Argentine paintings
Works about the Argentine War of Independence
1908 paintings
National Historical Museum (Argentina)
Paintings in Argentina
Books in art